Robert Bryan Cogman (born July 25, 1979) is an American television writer and producer.  He wrote eleven episodes of the HBO series Game of Thrones.

He is also the author of the book Inside HBO's Game of Thrones which features a preface by A Song of Ice and Fire author George R. R. Martin.

Early life
Cogman was born in Oklahoma City, and moved to the Washington, D.C. area when his father became Chief of Staff to U.S. Senator Dewey Bartlett.

He attended Winston Churchill High School in Potomac, Maryland, a suburb of Washington, DC.  He was in the class of 1997.

He was educated at the Juilliard School and graduated with a BFA in Acting, class of 2001. Juilliard classmates included Lee Pace, Anthony Mackie, Tracie Thoms, and Steven Boyer.

After graduating from Juilliard, "spent the next decade working on his acting career, with little to show for it". Unable to get consistent work as an actor, he sold printer cartridges on the side to pay rent.

Career

Bryan Cogman eventually became a writer for HBO's Game of Thrones.  His wife was working as a nanny for David Benioff, at the same time that Cogman was working on a pilot pitch script (for a project that never materialized). Benioff agreed to read over Cogman's script, and was impressed enough that he hired him as a personal assistant. Benioff began working with Cogman and got him a job as a writer's assistant on NBC's My Own Worst Enemy. The show only lasted nine episodes, but the same day it was cancelled, HBO officially picked up Game of Thrones with David Benioff as co-showrunner. Benioff hired Cogman as his personal assistant, copy-editing scripts in the first season, but then abruptly promoted him to be the official writer for the fourth episode. Cogman remained a staff writer for the rest of the show's run.

In 2014, Cogman was hired by 20th Century Fox to write a feature film based on characters and stories from Magic: The Gathering, a popular fantasy trading card game.

Cogman gave an interview with ThinkProgress in 2012.

In 2015, it was announced he would pen the live-action remake of The Sword in the Stone for Disney.

In September 2017, Cogman was announced as a creator of a developing fifth Game of Thrones prequel series. In April 2019, Cogman confirmed that this potential series would not be moving forward.

In May 2019, George R. R. Martin mentioned on his blog that Cogman would be helping Amazon Video with their new The Lord of the Rings series. More recently, he signed a deal with Entertainment One.

In March 2023, Cogman was announced as the series showrunner for the Disney+ television adaptation of Zorro with Wilmer Valderrama set to star.

Filmography

Film

Television

References

External links 

 
 Twitter

1979 births
Living people
Juilliard School alumni
American male screenwriters
American television writers
American writers
American screenwriters
American male television writers
Hugo Award-winning writers